Rajab Ahmad Juma is a former Member of Parliament in the National Assembly of Tanzania.

Sources
 Who returned? Performance in the Bunge and MP re-election 

Members of the National Assembly (Tanzania)
Living people
Year of birth missing (living people)
Place of birth missing (living people)
21st-century Tanzanian politicians